Camisa or Kamisa, also known as Comassa and possibly as Eumeis, was a town of Lesser Armenia, inhabited during Hellenistic, Roman, and Byzantine times. It loaned its name to the surrounding district of Camisene or Comisene; it was destroyed in Strabo's time. Salt was mined here in antiquity.

Its site is located in Sivas Province Asiatic Turkey.

References

Populated places in ancient Lesser Armenia
Former populated places in Turkey
Roman towns and cities in Turkey
Populated places of the Byzantine Empire
History of Sivas Province